= Them Airs =

Them Airs are an American rock band formed in the late 2010s near New Haven, Connecticut.

The band was originally composed of Cade Williams on guitar, Adam Cohen on bass, and Evan Nork on drums. The group also featured Luke Schroeder and Hayden Nork on guitar, as well as Amina Rustemovic on keyboard.

== History ==
Core members Williams, Cohen and Evan Nork began writing music together in high school. In college, they began performing under the name Mirror Waves. Rustemovic, Schroeder and Nork's brother Hayden would later play for the group, giving it six members at its peak. By 2019, the band's evolving sound necessitated a name-change. Due to the migration of the band's various members, it is no longer regularly active.

== Sound ==
Them Airs are regarded as having an eclectic and pioneering musical style, drawing from multiple genres in the punk rock and DIY scenes. Their work features synthesizers and guitar pedals common in modern rock music, but also less conventional instruments such as the saxophone and the accordion.

== Discography ==
=== Albums ===
- Can't Pave Love (2017)
- Tiger Blood (2018)
- Echo Park Bomb City (2019)
- Union Suit XL (2020)
- Doped Runner Verse (2020)

=== Extended plays ===
- Backflip (2019)
- River Defender, Reflector, Refractor, River, Crypt Mask Anthology (2019)
- Viper Island (2023)

=== Singles ===
- THATCHER PILL XR (2019)
- Everett David (2020)
- Exploded Whip (2022)
- VR Fletching (2022)
